Elisabeth Chojnacka (born Elżbieta Ukraińczyk; 10 September 1939 – 28 May 2017) was a Polish harpsichordist living in France. She was one of the world's foremost harpsichordists specializing in the performance of contemporary harpsichord music.

Biography

Chojnacka earned a degree from the Fryderyk Chopin Music Academy in Warsaw in 1962, after which she moved to Paris, where she studied with Aimee Wiele. She presented the premiere performances of many works for harpsichord, both solo as well as with ensemble and/or electronics. Over 80 composers dedicated works to her. While she was known particularly for her performance of new music, she also played early music in her concerts, as well as in some of her recordings. In performance, she generally performed with her harpsichord slightly amplified.

She formerly taught at the Mozarteum University of Salzburg in Salzburg, Austria, beginning in 1995. She performed and recorded with the Xenakis Ensemble. She won the Grand Prix du Disque for Modern Music in 2003, for her recording of works by Maurice Ohana.

Death
Chojnacka died on 28 May 2017 in Paris at the age of 77.

Discography
Ohana harpsichord / Ohana - Clavecin 	
Energy
Plus que Tango
Scott Joplin
Energy Plus
Poulenc
Xénakis
Ohana
Rhythm Plus
Clavecin espagnol du XXème Siècle
Clavecin 2000
L'avant-garde du passé
Le nouveau clavecin
Clavecin d'aujourd'hui

References

Links
 Harpsichord 2000 website
 Elisabeth Chojnacka profile, nieuwe-muziek.nl

Sources
 Harley, James Xenakis: his life in music p. 103, Routledge, New York (2004)  

1939 births
2017 deaths
Polish harpsichordists
French harpsichordists
Contemporary classical music performers
Chopin University of Music alumni
Recipients of the Gold Medal for Merit to Culture – Gloria Artis
20th-century Polish musicians
20th-century French musicians
20th-century classical musicians
21st-century Polish musicians
21st-century French musicians
21st-century classical musicians
Musicians from Warsaw
Academic staff of Mozarteum University Salzburg